Uwe Karpa (born 18 September 1945) is a German actor and voice actor.

Acting career
He has been performing roles in theatre, film, and television since 1965. Karpa received his acting training in Karl-Marx-Stadt. He performed in theatres in, among others, Frankfurt an der Oder, Berlin, Dresden, and Bad Segeberg. On television, he was particularly well known between 1996 and 2005 in the role of staff nurse Brenneke (Oberpfleger Brenneke) in the series Alphateam – Die Lebensretter im OP. He had his cinematic debut in 1965 in Berlin um die Ecke. In 2007 in Der Baader-Meinhof-Komplex, he played the role of the police chief.

Selected filmography

Film

Television

External links
 
 Deutsche Synchronkartei entry 
 Uwe Karpa at Ramona Mohren talent agency

1945 births
Living people
Male actors from Berlin
German male television actors
German male film actors
German male stage actors